On 7 June 2013, a 20-year-old college student was abducted, gang-raped and murdered in Kamduni village, 16km from Barasat, North 24 Parganas district about 20km from main Kolkata. In January 2016 the accused were sentenced to death and life imprisonment.

Incident 
The victim, a second year BA student of Derozio College named Shipra Ghosh, was walking home along the Kamduni BDO Office Road in the afternoon, when she was abducted and taken inside a factory where she was gang-raped by eight men. After raping her, the perpetrators tore apart her legs up to the navel, slit her throat and dumped her body into a nearby field.  

At around 8:30 PM local time, the brothers of the victim discovered the body of their sister alongside a bheri in the At Bigha region of Kharibari in Rajarhat. At around 9:45 PM, an altercation and subsequent skirmish occurred between the villagers and the police when the latter tried to recover the body of the victim. The crowd damaged three police vehicles. At around 2 AM, a large police contingent recovered the victim's body from the villagers and sent it to Barasat for post mortem.

On the evening of June 15, a contingent of the Indian Reserve Battalion started flag march in Kamduni. In spite of the paramilitary vigil a team of Citizen's Forum visited Kamduni. Several women's organizations, including Matangini Mahila Samiti, Maitri, Manabi, Ahalya and Chetana, visited Kamduni.

On 17 June, Mamata Banerjee, the Chief Minister of West Bengal visited Kamduni. She promised that charge sheet would be produced against the arrested within 15 days of the incident and that her government would plead for the capital punishment of the culprits.

Arrest and prosecuation 
The residents of Kamduni caught hold of Ansar Ali, the prime accused, and handed him over to the police. After interrogation, he confessed to have committed the crime along with four others. Five persons were named in the FIR. Based on that, the district police arrested three persons in the early hours of 8 June.

The case is being investigated by the CID, West Bengal. On 16 June, the CID officers took the eight accused to Kamduni to reconstruct the incident amid tight security by the police and Indian Reserve Battalion. For 45 minutes, the accused recounted how they had gang raped and then murdered the victim, throwing her body over the set wall afterwards. Even fifteen days after the incident, no charge sheet was filed. On 22 June, Ansar Ali was remanded in judicial custody for 14 days. The accused and State Govt. want the legal proceedings shifted from Barasat court.

Finally in January 2016, the accused were sentenced - some were sentenced to death and others to life imprisonment.  Additional Sessions Judge Sanchita Sarkar handed out a death sentence to  Ansar Ali, Saiful Ali and Aminul Ali, while Emanul Islam, Aminur Islam and Bhola Naskar were sentenced to life imprisonment for the gang-rape and murder of Shipra Ghosh on June 7, 2013.

Protests 
From the early morning of 8 June, the Kamduni residents protested afor exemplary punishment for the culprits. Jyotipriya Mallick, the Minister for Food and Supplies met the villagers and promised job for the victim's elder brother, which was promptly rejected by the villagers. The protesters were also visited by Haji Nurul Islam, the M.P. from Bashirhat and Nirmal Ghosh, the President of North 24 Parganas District Trinamool Congress. When the former blamed the CPI(M) for this crime, his car was damaged by the protesters. Protests continued until July 4, demanding capital punishment for the perpetrators.

Several human rights groups participated in the protests as well, submitting memoranda to the police and demanding access to political decisionmakers. The lawyers of Barasat Bar took out a procession in protest against the crime. The body declared that no lawyer in Barasat would stand for the accused. In the evening a hundreds of residents brought out a candle light procession in  Baguiati, Kolkata. On 18 June, around 400 government employees of the Writers' Building marched around the Writers' Building in protest against the Kamduni gang rape and murder. Eminent intellectuals including, filmmaker Aparna Sen, Shankha Ghosh, Nabaneeta Dev Sen, Mrinal Sen, Mahashweta Devi and Tarun Majumder also showed their support for the victim and demanded justice.

See also
2012 Delhi gang rape case
1990 Bantala rape case

References 

2013 murders in Asia
2013 murders in India
Murder in India
Gang rape in India
Violence against women in India
Sex crimes in India
Crime in West Bengal
Crime in Kolkata
Incidents of violence against women
June 2013 events in India